Bhaijaan Elo Re is an Indian Bengali-language action comedy film directed by Joydip Mukherjee. The film stars Bangladeshi superstar Shakib Khan and Srabanti Chatterjee and Payel Sarkar in the lead roles. The cast also includes Rajatabha Dutta, Kharaj Mukherjee, Shantilal Mukherjee, Shahed Ali, Monira Mithu, Saruar Abedin and Deepa Khandakar. The film is produced by Filmbazar Limited.

The film is also the fourth collaboration between Bangladeshi superstar Shakib Khan and director Joydeep Mukherjee and also the second collaboration between Khan and actress Srabanti after the film Shikari, which was directed by Mukherjee.

Plot
Separated at birth, after 28 years Bhai and Jaan grow up to be as different from each other as can be. While Bhai is outspoken and a little bit of a troublemaker a daring costume designer, Jaan is quite shy and timid. After years of being apart, fate brings the two brothers together, and things take an interesting turn from this point.

Cast
 Shakib Khan as Ajaan/Ujaan
 Srabanti Chatterjee as Hiya
 Payel Sarkar as Runa
 Rajatabha Dutta as Hiya's Father
 Deepa Khandakar as Ajaan/Ujaan Didi
 Monira Mithu as Shanti
 Shantilal Mukherjee as Sudhir Mukharjee
 Biswanath Basu as Ajaan's friend
 Mritul Sen
 Sourav Ghosh
 Churabhanu Basu
 Donna Preston 
 Sukonya Bhattacharya
 Kiriti Karjilal
 Joynto Hor
 Amitabh Bhattacharya  as Doctor
 Poltu Polle
 Somor Pal
 Mousumi Saha
 Lee Nicholas Harris as Police officer
 Richard Banks as Police officer 3 
 Olga Savic as Plane Passenger 
 Iman Zand as Police officer 2
 Romel Onuoha as Mugger
 Shariful Raaz

Production 
The film was shot in Kolkata, West Bengal and in the United Kingdom.

Soundtrack 

The soundtrack of Bhaijaan Elo Re is composed by Savvy & Dolaan Mainnakk. The first song from the soundtrack, "Baby Jaan", is sung by Nakash Aziz & Antara Mitra. The music video of "Baby Jaan" received an overwhelming response on YouTube, creating a record of becoming the fastest Bengali language music video to reach 1 million (10 lakh) views within 24 Hours. The second song from the soundtrack, "Tor Naam", also became popular among audiences in Bangladesh and West Bengal. The title track has been sung by popular Bollywood singer Abhijeet Bhattacharya.

Track listing
Notes

 "Baby Jaan" is programmed by Dolaan Maainnakk, mixed and mastered by Subhadeep Mitra, and features guitars played by Shomu Seal.
 "Tor Naam" is programmed by Dolaan Mainnakk, mixed and mastered by Subhadeep Mitra, and features guitars played by Raja Choudhury and additional vocals by Kinjal Chattopadhyay. 
 "Bhaijaan Eid E Elo Re" is programmed by Praveen Paul, mixed and mastered by Subhadeep Mitra, and features guitars played by Somu Seal.

References

External links 
 

Indian romantic drama films
2018 films
Films shot in London
Films shot in the United Kingdom
Films shot in Kolkata
Bengali-language Indian films
2010s Bengali-language films
Films directed by Joydip Mukherjee